Bina may refer to:

Languages
 Bina language, a Kainji language of Nigeria
 Bina language (Papua New Guinea), an extinct Austronesian language

Science and technology
 Bina (missile), an Iranian surface-to-surface and air-to-surface missile
 Bina Refinery, an oil refinery in Bina-Etawa, India
 Bina Thermal Power Plant, in Bina-Etawa, India
 BINA48, a robot
 Biphenylindanone A (BINA), a research agent
 Gorgyra bina, a butterfly species
 Schinia bina, a moth species

Places
 Binə, Baku, Azerbaijan
 Binə, Khojavend, Azerbaijan
 Bina (river), Bavaria, Germany
 Bina-Etawa, Madhya Pradesh, India
 Bina Assembly constituency, Madhaya Pradesh, India
 Bina Railway Colony, Madhya Pradesh, India
 Bina Junction railway station
 Bina River (India), Madhya Pradesh, India
 Bíňa, Slovakia
 Bina, North Carolina, US

People

Surname
 Eric Bina (born 1964), American software programmer
 Malke Bina, American Orthodox Jewish feminist
 Martin Bína (born 1983), Czech cyclo-cross cyclist
 Robbie Bina (born 1983), American ice hockey player
 Shirin Bina (born 1964), Iranian actress
 Sima Bina (born 1945), Iranian traditional musician

Given name
 Bina Abramowitz (1865–1953), Russian-American Yiddish actress
 Bina Addy (1894–1962), Indian Bengali singer
 Bina Agarwal, Indian economist
 Bina Avrile, Italian shotgun shooter
 Bina Basnett (born 1984/5), Indian politician in Sikkim
 Bina Devi Budhathoki (born 1970), member of the Nepal House of Representatives
 Bina Cursiter (1854–1934), Scottish suffragist
 Bina D'Costa, Australian-Bangladeshi academic specializing in gender studies
 Bina Daigeler, German costume designer
 Bina Das (1911–1986), Indian revolutionary and nationalist from West Bengal
 Bina Deneen (1868–1950), first lady of Illinois, US, 1904–1912
 Bina Devi (born c. 1977), Indian farmer and entrepreneur
 Bina Devi (Nepalese politician), member of the Federal Parliament of Nepal
 Bina Sarkar Ellias (born 1949), Indian poet
 Bina Jaiswal (born 1990), Nepalese politician
 Bina Kak (born 1954), Indian politician and actress
 Bina Lama, Nepalese politician
 Bina Landau (1925–1988), Polish-born American soprano folk and art singer
 Bina Sheth Lashkari, Indian educator
 Bina Magar (born 1983), Nepalese politician
 Bina West Miller (1867–1954), American businesswoman
 Bina Mistry, Tanzanian-born Indian-British Hindi/Gujarati singer
 Bina Mondal, Indian politician
 Bina Mossman (1893–1990), Hawaiian-American musician and politician
 Bina Paul (or Beena Paul) (born 1961), Indian film editor
 Bina Pokharel, Nepalese politician
 Bina Qeredaxi (born 1988), Iraqi filmmaker
 Bina Rai (1931–2009), Indian Hindi film actress
 Bina Ramesh (born 1979), New Caledonian javelin thrower
 Bina Rothschild (1902–1965), German aristocrat and actress
 Bina Shah (born 1972), Pakistani writer
 Bina Sharif, Pakistani-American playwright, actress, and director
 Bina Shaheen Siddiqui, Pakistani chemist
 Bina Shrestha, Nepalese politician
 Bina Singh, Indian politician
 Bina Kumari Thanet, Nepalese politician
 Bina Theeng Tamang (born 1980), Nepalese educator, writer, and poet
 Bina Venkataraman (born 1979), American science policy expert and journalist
 Bina Štampe Žmavc (born 1951), Slovene writer, poet, director and translator

See also
 Beena (disambiguation)
 Binah (disambiguation)